The 2019 season of the Albanian Futsal Championship was the 16th season of top-tier futsal in Albania. The regular season started on 21 April 2019, and ended on 27 May 2017. After the end of the regular season, all four teams played in the championship playoffs.

Tirana won the competition for the 8th time.

Teams

League table

Title Playoffs

References

Futsal
Albanian Futsal Championship
Albania